Effurun is a town and the headquarters of Uvwie Local Government Area in Delta State, Nigeria. It is an Urban center, densely populated with different infrastructural development. it borders it's twin city Warri, also serves as an entrance to Warri.

It shares boundaries with Agbarho to the east, Udu to the south, Ughelli South to the south east, Okpe to the north and Warri to the west. Due to her proximity with Warri, rapid population growth and several road network linking both towns and her environs, it formed a conurbation collectively referred to as Warri by people from other parts of the state and Nigeria at large, though each towns in "Warri conurbation" are under different traditional and political authorities.

Effurun is one of the major hubs of economic activities and businesses in Delta State. 

The city herself is indigenous to the Uvwie people, a subgroup of the Urhobo.

Its inhabitants are predominantly Christians of different denominations, and some practice a mixture of African traditional religion most notably the Igbe religion common amongst Urhobos like most of Southern Nigeria. The city along with Warri and environs are known nationwide for her unique Pidgin English.

Higher institutions

Petroleum Training Institute (PTI) at Effurun, Delta State
Federal University of Petroleum Resources Effurun (FUPRE) at Ugbomro, Effurun, Delta State

References

Towns in Delta State